Ajayanti Pradhan is an Indian politician from the Indian National Congress, who was elected from the G. Udayagiri assembly constituency from the state of Orissa in 2004.

Career

2004 elections
In the 2004 Odisha Legislative Assembly election, Ajayanti Pradhan won the G. Udayagiri (Odisha Vidhan Sabha constituency).

In the 2009 Odisha Legislative Assembly election, Manoj Pradhan of the BJP won the G Udaygiri seat, defeating the sitting Member of the Legislative Assembly Ajayanti Pradhan, of the Indian National Congress by 20,000 votes.

References

 

Living people
Year of birth missing (living people)
People from Kandhamal district
Odisha MLAs 2004–2009
Indian National Congress politicians from Odisha